Kingdom of Fear is the fourth studio album by the Swedish band In Battle. The album was released through Candlelight Records and Nocturnal Arts Productions.

Track listing
 "Kingdom of Fear" - 4:38
 "The Multitude" - 4:04
 "The Wandering One" - 4:48
 "Follow the Allfather" - 3:51
 "Tyr" - 3:12
 "The Dead Shall See" - 4:22
 "The Curse" - 3:08
 "I Kamp" - 4:18
 "Terrorkings" - 3:48
 "Path of Power" - 4:17
 "Raven Calls" - 4:24

Personnel
Per the album's notes.
John Odhinn Sandin - vocals
Hasse Carlsson - guitar
Tomas Elofsson - guitar
John Frölén - bass
Nils Fjallström - drums
Tim Turan - mastering

References

2007 albums
In Battle albums